Enneapterygius altipinnis also known as the highfin triplefin is a species of triplefin blenny in the genus Enneapterygius. It is found in the Red Sea. It was regarded as a synonym of Enneapterygius tutuilae but in 2018 the species was reinstated as being valid.

References

altipinnis
Fish described in 1980
Taxa named by Eugenie Clark